The Needle Shop was an early American television program which aired on the DuMont Television Network in a 15-minute timeslot at 2:30pm ET weekdays. The program aired on New York City television station WABD from 1948 to 1949.

Broadcast history
This series is significant as representing part of WABD's daytime experiment. While not the first with daytime programming, the station was the first to introduce a schedule which began in the morning and continued through to the end of prime-time, at a time when daytime and afternoon broadcasting was heavy on test patterns.

The series was about sewing, and was hosted by Alice Burrows, who was age 62 when she started appearing on the series. She was described in a news article as "pretty, silvery-haired and bristling with energy".

According to the book What Women Watched: Daytime Television in the 1950s (University of Texas Press, 2005) by Marsha Cassidy, the DuMont daytime schedule beginning in January 1949 was:

10-10:30am   Johnny Olson's Rumpus Room
10:30-11am  Welcome, Neighbors
11am-12noon  The Stan Shaw Show
12noon-12:15pm   Amanda
12:15-12:30pm  Man in the Street
12:30-12:45pm  Camera Headlines
12:45-1pm   Fashions in Song
1-1:30pm   Okay, Mother
2:30-3pm  Inside Photoplay (The Wendy Barrie Show)
3-3:15pm  The Needle Shop
3:15-3:30pm  Vincent Lopez Speaking (The Vincent Lopez Show)

Preservation status
As with most DuMont series, no episodes are known to exist, as live local shows were very rarely kinescoped for many years. Additionally, 1940s daytime television series are poorly preserved as a whole, with only a few scattered kinescopes known to be held by television archives (one of which, an experimental one-off telecast of the Breakfast Club radio show, aired on WABD).

Reception
Billboard magazine felt a younger and more attractive host would have been a better choice, but also stated that Burrows "obviously knows her stuff" and that the series "might prove of value".

See also
List of programs broadcast by the DuMont Television Network
List of surviving DuMont Television Network broadcasts
1948-1949 United States network television schedule (weekday)
Amanda - Also part of the 1948 WABD morning line-up

References

One Stop Shop

External links
The Needle Shop on IMDB

1948 American television series debuts
1949 American television series endings
DuMont Television Network original programming
Black-and-white American television shows
American live television series
Lost television shows